Linwood may refer to:

Places
Many of the place names for Linwood come from the presence of linden trees.

Australia
Linwood, South Australia
Linnwood, Guildford, 11-35 Byron Road, Guildford, New South Wales

Canada
Linwood, Ontario
Linwood, Nova Scotia

New Zealand
Linwood, New Zealand
Linwood (New Zealand electorate)
Linwood Cemetery, Christchurch
Linwood College
Linwood North School

United Kingdom
Linwood, Hampshire, England
Mary Linwood Comprehensive School, Leicester, England
Linwood, Lincolnshire, England
Linwood, Renfrewshire, Scotland
Linwood High School

United States

Linwood Elementary School (Georgia), Warner Robins, Georgia
Linwood, Indiana
Linwood Cemetery (Dubuque), Iowa
Linwood, Kansas
Linwood Elementary School (Kansas), Wichita, Kansas
Linwood (Jackson, Louisiana), listed on the NRHP in East Feliciana Parish
Linwood (Richmond, Kentucky), home of Brutus J. Clay II
Linwood, Carroll County, Maryland
Linwood Historic District (Linwood, Maryland), listed on the NRHP in Maryland
Linwood, Howard County, Maryland
Linwood, Massachusetts
Linwood Historic District (Northbridge, Massachusetts), listed on the NRHP in Massachusetts
Linwood, Michigan
Linwood Lake, Minnesota, in Saint Louis County
Linwood Township, Anoka County, Minnesota
Linwood Boulevard, Kansas City, Missouri
Linwood Shopping Center, Kansas City, Missouri
Linwood, Nebraska
Linwood Site, in Linwood, Nebraska, listed on the NRHP in Butler County
Linwood Township, Butler County, Nebraska
Lin-Wood Public School, serving Lincoln and Woodstock, New Hampshire
Linwood, New Jersey in Atlantic County
Linwood Historic District (Linwood, New Jersey), listed on the NRHP in Atlantic County
Linwood Public Schools
Linwood, Bergen County, New Jersey
Linwood (York, New York), listed on the NRHP in Livingston County, N.Y.
Linwood, North Carolina
Linwood Yard, railroad yard
Linwood Female College, near Gastonia, North Carolina
Linwood, Cincinnati, Ohio
Linwood Park, a private resort park in Vermilion, Ohio
Linwood, Pennsylvania
Linwood, Utah
Linwood, Wisconsin
Linwood Springs Research Station, Stevens Point, Wisconsin
Linwood, West Virginia

Antarctica
Linwood Peak

Other uses
Linwood (name)
Linwood bank robbery (1969), Linwood, Renfrewshire, Scotland

See also
Linnwood (disambiguation)
Lynnwood (disambiguation)
Lynwood (disambiguation)